Pete Lynch (born March 31, 1980 in Silver Spring, Maryland) is an American singer, songwriter and multi-instrumentalist. In addition to singing lead and backing vocals, 
Lynch plays bass, guitar, keyboards and percussion.

Early life 

Pete Lynch was born in Silver Spring, Maryland on March 31, 1980. He is the son of an English teacher and a Czech dissident and university professor, who fled Czechoslovakia in 1968. Growing up in a highly musical family, Pete discovered his love for music early. At six, he purchased his first album, "The Who - Live at Leeds" and began learning his first chords from his dad, a former guitarist in a Czech underground band. Pete soon moved on to the bass guitar. At the tender age of eleven, he founded his own band and played his first concerts.

Musical style 

Pete Lynch has been compared to the young Peter Gabriel and his musical style is considered alternative rock. He plays many of the instruments featured on his recordings himself.

Pete Lynch Discography 

"Nothing more Painful Than The Truth" EP, October 17. 2010

"Face Me!" Album, March 21. 2011

"One Way Is Enough" Soundtrack "One Way Trip", October 12.2011

"Keep 'Em Comin" Soundtrack "Taking It Back", Winner Of The Austin Film Festival 2014 Audience Award

"Till the Rivers Run Dry" Single, March 31. 2017

"Kill the Monster" Album, May 19. 2017

"Till the Rivers Run Dry (Acoustic)" Single, June 9. 2017

"Kill the Monster (Peteus Mix & Tim Palmer Mix)" Single, June 27. 2017

References

External links 
 www.petelynchmusic.com
 http://concertcrap.com/2017/05/22/album-review-pete-lynch-kill-the-monster
 http://thinkinglyrically.wordpress.com/2017/05/16/review-pete-lynch-kill-the-monster
 http://madnesstocreation.net/2017/05/23/unleash-them-kill-the-monster-by-pete-lynch-introspection-at-its-finest
 http://groovey.tv/pete-lynch-album-review
 http://tempelores.com/?p=17496
 www.musicblendonline.com/pete-lynch-kill-monster
 www.eclipsed.de/aktuell/art-sysyphus-vol-93
 http://rothnroll.blogspot.se/2017/04/quickbits-roshambo-message-from-sylvia.html
 http://invictamag.com/review-pete-lynch-kill-the-monster-album
 http://925rebellion.com/pete-lynch-kill-monster
 http://www.purevolume.com/news/PREMIERE-Pete-Lynch-Kill-the-Monster-Stream
 http://musicexistence.com/blog/2017/04/11/album-review-pete-lynch-kill-the-monster
 http://www.gavthegothicchav.com/reviews/pete-lynch-kill-the-monster
 https://www.therockpit.net/2017/pete-lynch-releases-music-video-for-till-the-rivers-run-dry
 http://highlightmagazine.net/2017/04/19/premiere-pete-lynch-releases-music-video-for-till-the-rivers-run-dry
 http://ventsmagazine.com/2017/03/29/pete-lynch-shares-arena-ready-alt-rock-single
 http://survivingthegoldenage.com/pete-lynch-till-the-rivers-run-dry
 http://www.schwaebische.de/panorama/kultur_artikel,-Pete-Lynch-Musik-eines-Abenteurers-_arid,10679576.html
 https://gaesteliste.de/review/show.html?id=99006298&_nr=17631
 http://www.ruhrnachrichten.de/leben-und-erleben/unterhaltung/musik/cdkritik/CD-Kritik-200-Worte-ueber-Pete-Lynch-und-Kill-the-Monster;art598,3274779
 http://frizz-ab.de/rezensionen/gepresstes/pete-lynch-kill-the-monster
 Frankenpost.de
 Taking It Back Wins Audience Award Austin Film Festival 2014

1980 births
Living people
American male singer-songwriters
American singer-songwriters
American rock singers
American rock songwriters
21st-century American singers
21st-century American male singers